A video game content rating system is a system used for the classification of video games based on suitability for target audiences. Most of these systems are associated with and/or sponsored by a government, and are sometimes part of the local motion picture rating system. The utility of such ratings has been called into question by studies that publish findings such as 90% of teenagers claim that their parents "never" check the ratings before allowing them to rent or buy video games, and as such, calls have been made to "fix" the existing rating systems. Video game content rating systems can be used as the basis for laws that cover the sales of video games to minors, such as in Australia. Rating checking and approval is part of the game localization when they are being prepared for their distribution in other countries or locales. These rating systems have also been used to voluntarily restrict sales of certain video games by stores, such as the German retailer Galeria Kaufhof's removal of all video games rated 18+ by the USK following the Winnenden school shooting.

Comparison table 
A comparison of current video game rating systems, showing age on the horizontal axis. Note however that the specific criteria used in assigning a classification can vary widely from one country to another. Thus a color code or age range cannot be directly compared from one country to another.

Key:

  White  – No restrictions: Suitable for all ages / Aimed at young audiences / Exempt / Not rated / No applicable rating.
  Yellow  – No restrictions: Parental guidance is suggested for designated age range.
  Purple  – No restrictions: Not recommended for a younger audience but not restricted.	
  Red  – Restricted: Parental accompaniment required for younger audiences.
  Black  – Prohibitive: Exclusively for older audience / Purchase age-restricted / Banned.

In the above table, Italics indicate a multinational/transnational organization.

Initial controversy 

Similar to other forms of media, video games have been the subject of argument between leading professionals and restriction and prohibition. Often these bouts of criticism come from use of debated topics such as video game graphic violence, virtual sex, violent and gory scenes, partial or full nudity, drug use, portrayal of criminal behavior or other provocative and objectionable material.
Video games have also been studied for links to addiction and aggression. A meta analysis of studies from both eastern and western countries yielded evidence that "strongly suggests that exposure to violent video games is a causal risk factor for increased aggressive behavior, aggressive cognition, and aggressive affect and for decreased empathy and prosocial behavior."

There are also groups that have argued to the contrary, that few if any scientifically proven studies exist to back up these claims, and that the video game industry has become an easy target for the media to blame for many contemporary issues. Researchers have also proposed potential positive effects of video games on aspects of social and cognitive development and psychological well-being. It has been shown that action video game players have better hand-eye coordination and visuo-motor skills, such as their resistance to distraction, their sensitivity to information in the peripheral vision and their ability to count briefly presented objects, than non-players.

Rating systems

Argentina 
The law 26.043 (passed in 2005) states that the National Council of Children, Youth and Family ('Consejo Nacional de la Niñez, Adolescencia y la Familia') in coordination with the National Institute of Cinema and Audiovisual Arts will be the government agencies that assigns age ratings. The Argentine Game Developer Association (Asociación de Desarrolladores de Videojuegos Argentina) was critical of the law. There are three ratings: "Suitable for all public", "Suitable for those over 13 years of age" and "Suitable for those over 18 years of age".

Australia 

The Australian Classification Board (ACB) is a statutory classification body formed by the Australian Government which classifies films, video games and publications for exhibition, sale or hire in Australia since its establishment in 1970. The Classification Board was originally incorporated in the Office of Film and Literature Classification (OFLC) which was dissolved in 2006. Originally a part of the Attorney-General's Department and overseen by the Minister for Justice, the ACB is now a branch of the Department of Communications and the Arts which provides administrative support to the Board and is overseen by the Minister for Communications & the Arts. Decisions made by the Board may be reviewed by the Australian Classification Review Board.

Austria 
There is no uniform ratings system in Austria, and the nine states regulate content in different ways. The two main systems are PEGI (applied in Vienna) and Germany's USK system (applied in Salzburg).

Brazil 

The advisory rating (ClassInd) (Classificação Indicativa in Portuguese) rates films, games and television shows in Brazil. It is controlled by the Ministry of Justice (Ministério da Justiça).

Chile 

Games are classified by the Council of Cinematographic Classification (Consejo de Calificación Cinematográfica) which is a central agency under the Ministry of Education. 

The current age ratings are:
 TE (Todo Espectador) – General audience (no objectionable content).
 Mayores de 8 años – Not recommended for children younger than 8 years.
 Mayores de 14 años – Not recommended for children younger than 14 years.
 Mayores de 18 años – Not recommended for children younger than 18 years.

In addition to these ratings an educational category also exists.

China 

China introduced a pilot content rating system in December 2020 called the Online Game Age-Appropriateness Warning, which is overseen by the governmental agency  (CADPA). Games with online components are required to show one of the three classifications on websites and registration pages: green for "8+" (appropriate for players 8 years and older), blue for "12+", and yellow for "16+".

Europe 

The Pan European Game Information (PEGI) is a European video game content rating system established to help European parents make informed decisions on buying computer games with logos on games boxes. It was developed by the Interactive Software Federation of Europe (ISFE) and came into use in April 2003; it replaced many national age rating systems with a single European system. The PEGI system is now used in more than thirty-one countries and is based on a code of conduct, a set of rules to which every publisher using the PEGI system is contractually committed. PEGI self-regulation is composed by five age categories and seven content descriptors that advise the suitability and content of a game for a certain age range based on the games content. The age rating does not indicate the difficulty of the game or the skill required to play it.Turkey is a semi-official user of PEGI, but it is not represented in the PEGI council, alongside Northern Cyprus but it is not recognized internationally.

Germany 

Unterhaltungssoftware Selbstkontrolle (USK) (Entertainment Software Self-control), is Germany's software rating organization founded in 1994.
 USK 0 - Playable for all ages
 USK 6 - Ages 6 and over
 USK 12 - Ages 12 and over
 USK 16 - Ages 16 and over
 USK 18 - Ages 18 and over

Indonesia 

The Indonesian Game Rating System (IGRS) is an official video game content rating system founded and set by the Indonesian Ministry of Communication and Informatics in 2016. IGRS rates games that are developed and published in Indonesia. There are 5 classifications of ratings based on the game content, which includes the use of alcohol, cigarettes, drugs, violence, blood, language, sexual content, etc.

These are the following classifications:
 SU ("Semua Umur", All Ages in English) Playable for all ages.
 3+ Age 3 and over. No restricted content is shown including adult content, use of drugs, gambling simulation, and online interactions.
 7+ Age 7 and over. No restricted content is shown including adult content, use of drugs, gambling simulation, and online interactions. 
 13+ Age 13 and over. Restricted contents are partially shown, including light use of drugs and alcohol by figures/background characters, cartoon violence, mild language, gambling simulation, horror theme, and online interactions.
 18+ Age 18 and over. Restricted contents are mostly shown, if not all, including use of drugs and alcohol by main characters, realistic violence (blood, gore, mutilation, etc.), crude humor, gambling simulation, horror theme, and online interactions.

As of November 2019, various imported PlayStation titles released since then have been rated by the IGRS after SIE Asia opened their Indonesian office. Those titles are also marked as "Official Indonesia Products".

Iran 

The Entertainment Software Rating Association (ESRA) is a governmental video game content rating system that is used in Iran. Games that have been exempt from the rating are de facto banned from sale in Iran.

 +3Ages 3 and over
 +7Ages 7 and over
 +12Ages 12 and over
 +15Ages 15 and over
 +18Ages 18 and over

In practise, the rating applies largely to PC and mobile games, as none of the console games are officially released for the Iranian market.

Japan 
In Japan, the content rating is not required by law, but most commercial video game publishers take the industry self-regulations. Console manufacturers force for video game publishers that games must be rated by CERO. Distributors of PC games (mostly dating sims, visual novels, and eroge) require games having the approval of EOCS or Japan contents Review Center. These ratings are referred to by local governments, and the Ordinance Regarding the Healthy Development of Youths (青少年健全育成条例) prohibits retailers from supplying 18+ rating games to persons under 18. Dōjin softs don't have such restrictions, but distribution of obscene materials can be punished under the Article 175 of the Penal Code of Japan.

Computer Entertainment Rating Organization 

The  (CERO) is an organization that rates video games in Japan, with different levels of rating that inform the customer of the nature of the product and what age group it suits. It was established in June 2002 as a branch of the Computer Entertainment Supplier's Association, and became an officially recognized non-profit organization in December 2003. It currently consists of five age categories and nine content descriptors.

 AAll ages. Formerly "All."
 BAges 12 and over. Formerly "12."
 CAges 15 and over. Formerly "15."
 DAges 17 and over.
 ZAges 18 and over only. Formerly "18." This is the only rating that is legally enforced.
 CEROAssigned to free demos and trial versions of games
 審査予定Assigned to games which are currently awaiting classification

Ethics Organization of Computer Software 

The  (EOCS, or Sofurin) is an incorporated association that rates PC games in Japan. It was established on November 20, 1992, and was incorporated in 2009.

The current ratings are:

 General Software - All ages.
 General Software (recommended to ages 12 and over)
 General Software (recommended to ages 15 and over)
 Software that is banned from selling to persons under 18

Japan contents Review Center 

The  is a cooperative that reviews adult videos and adult PC games in Japan. The organization was founded on December 1, 2010 as  after the dissolution of the Content Soft Association (CSA).

Mexico 

On November 27, 2020, the Secretariat of the Interior (SEGOB) published a new set of guidelines on the Official Journal of the Federation called Lineamentos Generales del Sistema Mexicano de Equivalencias de Clasificación de Contenidos de Videojuegos (General Guidelines of the Mexican System of Classification Equivalencies for Video Game Content). This states that all games distributed in Mexico will have their own set of ratings effective May 27, 2021, replacing the ESRB ratings system that was being used, while still being in accordance with them.

The ratings are as follows:
 A (Todo Público): For all ages.
 B (+12 Años): Content for teens 12 and over.
 B15 (+15 Años): Content for ages 15 and over.
 C (Adultos +18 Años): Content not suitable for those under 18.
 D (Exclusivo Adultos): Extreme and adult content.
 P (Etiquetado Pendiente): Content pending for its classification.

New Zealand 

The Office of Film and Literature Classification (OFLC) is the government agency in New Zealand that is responsible for classification of all films, videos, publications, and some video games in New Zealand. It was created by the Films, Videos, and Publications Classification Act 1993 (FVPC Act), replacing various film classification acts, and is an independent Crown entity in terms of the Crown Entities Act 2004.  The head of the OFLC is called the Chief Censor, maintaining a title that has described the government officer in charge of censorship in New Zealand since 1916.

The current ratings are:

 G: This can be shown and sold to anyone.
 PG: Films and games with a PG label can be sold, hired, or shown to anyone. The PG label means guidance from a parent or guardian is recommended for younger viewers.
 M: Films and games with an M label can be sold, hired, or shown to anyone. Films with an M label are more suitable for mature audiences 16 years and over.
 R13: Restricted to persons 13 years and over.
 R15: Restricted to persons 15 years and over.
 R16: Restricted to persons 16 years and over.
 R18: Restricted to persons 18 years and over.
 R: Restricted to a particular class of people.

United States and Canada 

The Entertainment Software Rating Board (ESRB) is a self-regulatory organization that assigns age and content ratings, enforces industry-adopted advertising guidelines, and ensures responsible online privacy principles for computer and video games and other entertainment software in Canada and the United States.  PEGI ratings are used on some French-language games sold in Canada.  Despite being self-regulatory, in Canada, games rated by the ESRB are required by law to be rated and/or restricted, though this only varies at a province and territory level.  ESRB ratings can be found on games for Nintendo systems in the countries of Malaysia, Saudi Arabia, Singapore, and the United Arab Emirates.  This system was used in Mexico as well until it was replaced by a local rating system on May 27, 2021.

A similar system also exists for arcade video games, which is enforced by the American Amusement Machine Association (AAMA) and the Amusement and Music Operators Association (AMOA). It is called the Parental Advisory System, and uses three colors for ratings - green (Suitable for All Ages), yellow (Mild Content), and red (Strong Content). Stickers displaying the ratings are placed on the game marquees, and the rating can also be displayed during the attract mode if the game's developer or publisher chooses to do so.

Russia 

The Age classification of information products is a new statutory classification set of rules formed by the Russian Government after enacting in September 2012 a Federal Law of Russian Federation no. 436-FZ of 2010-12-23 “On Protecting of Children from Information Harmful to Their Health and Development”, which classifies films, video games and publications for exhibition, sale or hire in Russia since 1 September 2012. The Ministry of Culture provides administrative support to the classification.

Saudi Arabia 

The General Commission for Audiovisual Media (GCAM) is responsible for the age-ratings of films, television programs and interactive games.

Singapore 

The Info-communications Media Development Authority (IMDA) is a statutory board of the Singapore Government which regulates films, television programs and video games in Singapore.

Slovakia 

Jetnotný systém označovania (English: Unified System of Age Rating/Labeling) (JSO) is a statutory board of Ministry of Culture of Slovakia under act 589/2007, which regulates age restriction of films, television programs and video games in Slovakia. 

The current age ratings are:
 "Teddy bear's head" – Content targeted towards children younger than 12 years.
 U – General audience
 7 – Not recommended for children younger than 7 years.
 12 – Not recommended for children younger than 12 years.
 15 – Not recommended for children younger than 15 years.
 18 – Prohibited for minors under 18 years of age.

In addition, educational game ratings are:
 -7 – Targetted towards children younger than 7 years.
 7+ – Appropriate for persons 7 years and over.
 12+ – Appropriate for persons 12 years and over.
 15+ – Appropriate for persons 15 years and over.

The labeling is mandatory for all physical releases (Games redeemable from gift cards including), but there is no legislative basis for labeling electronic releases (instead, PEGI rating is shown).

South Africa 

The South African Film and Publication Board (FPB) is a statutory classification body formed by the South African Government under the Films and Publications Act of 1996 which classifies films, music, television programmes, and video games for exhibition, sale or hire in South Africa. Distributors and exhibitors are legally compelled to comply with the age ratings.

South Korea 

The Game Rating and Administration Committee (게임물관리위원회 Geimmul Gwanri Wiwonhoe) (GRAC) is the South Korean video game content rating board. A governmental organization, the GRAC rates video and computer games to inform customers of the nature of game contents.

Taiwan 

Game Software Rating Regulations (遊戲軟體分級辦法), also translated as Game Software Rating Management Regulations, is the video game content rating system used in Taiwan.

United Arab Emirates 

The National Media Council (NMC) is a body of the federal U.A.E. government which regulates all aspects of media production, publication, and media trade in the United Arab Emirates. The body was established under Federal Law (1) of 2006. By 2013, the NMC has sustained full authority over the media market in the country.

In 2018, the NMC introduced local age rating systems for various media, including video games available in retail.

In June 2021, the Ministry of Culture & Youth launched the Media Regulatory Office  (MRO) to execute a number of functions and tasks previously under the National Media Council, following a restructure of the federal U.A.E. government that was approved in July 2020. In June 2022, the 2018 NMC rating labels for video games began phasing out in favour of new labels reflecting the corporate image of the MRO. The ratings themselves are unchanged.

United Kingdom 

The British Board of Film Classification (BBFC), originally British Board of Film Censors, is a non-governmental organisation, funded by the film industry and responsible for the national classification of films within the United Kingdom. It has a statutory requirement to classify videos and DVDs.  It no longer has responsibility for rating video games in the UK.  This role has been passed to the Video Standards Council (formerly known as the VSC Rating Board).

In July 2012, the VSC Rating Board became the sole UK statutory video games regulator for the UK. The VSC Rating Board has been a PEGI Administrator since 2003 and subsequently uses the PEGI criteria to classify video games. The UK Interactive Entertainment Association, a UK industry trade group, works with the VSC to help properly label such games and provide informational material to parents. Games featuring strong pornographic content or ancillary mini-games to be included with a DVD feature will still be rated by the BBFC.

International 
IARC

Some app stores that support IARC use this rating in countries and regions where there is no rating system. The classification standard adopted by IARC is the same as that of PEGI. This rating is not recognized in some countries.

Usage 
The image below presents outdated usage of various video game content rating systems around the world. Countries filled with gradients are using several rating systems.

See also 
 International Age Rating Coalition
 Mobile software content rating system
 Motion picture content rating system
 Television content rating system
 Video game controversy

References

External links 
 Video games ratings face overhaul
 http://www.gamesindustry.biz/articles/tiga-responds-to-byron-review
 http://www.gamesindustry.biz/articles/ELSPA-concerned-by-Byron-proposals
 http://www.esrb.org/ratings/ratings_guide.jsp